Sharon Kelly may refer to:

 Sharon Pratt Kelly, mayor of the District of Columbia in 1991–1995
 Colleen Brennan, American porn actress also known as Sharon Kelly